Laiano may refer to:

Laiano, Cascina, a village in the province of Pisa, Italy
Laiano, Sant'Agata de' Goti, a village in the province of Benevento, Italy